The 1999 Richmond Spiders football team represented Richmond College during the 1999 NCAA Division I-AA football season.

Schedule

References 

Richmond Spiders football seasons
Richmond Spiders football
Richmond